Tristerix pubescens is a species of mistletoe found in Peru at elevations of 1300 to 4800

References

External links

pubescens
Flora of the Andes